Meruzhan Ter-Gulanyan (November 29, 1948, Javakhe region, village Goman) is a writer publicist, a member of mass media council of RA.

Biography
Meruzhan Ter-Gulanyan was born on November 29, 1948 in Goman, Javakhe. He entered the Yerevan State University in 1968, the faculty of Journalism.

In 1973, he worked in “Garun” magazine as a literary worker, then as a head of department, deputy of chief editor, and in 1986-1990 became a chief editor of the magazine. From 1988 to 1993 he was a founding director of “Javakhe Patriotic Union”.

In 1978, a number of his stories were translated in 21 languages and were published in «Дружба народов» magazine, led by Hrant Matevosyan. He is an author of more than 1000 essays, hints and publicist articles published in Armenia's as well as other countries’ press.

In 1990, he was a deputy of Supreme Council of the Armenian Soviet Socialist Republic. He was also a president of RA Standing Committee on Media Affairs and at the same time a member of the Presidium of the Supreme Council.  From 1995 to 1999 he was a member of Parliament, a member of science, education, culture and also the Youth Affairs Commission. During these years he authored and presented the laws of press, radio, TV, copyright and national archive fund.

In 1997, he founded the first independent “AR” TV and became the founder president. Before that he had founded the “Ar”, “Hanrapetutyun”, “Aspnjak” independent weeklies.
From 2006 to 2009 he was the chief editor of “De Facto” magazine.  From 2009 to 2011 he was the director of  “Ararat” TV.  On March 19, 2011, according to the results of the Presidential decree of the competition he was appointed a member of the Armenian Public Radio Television Council.  In 2012, he founded the “Andin” literary and social-political magazine, of which he is still the chief editor.

Awards and prizes
In 1980, he was awarded with WUA prize, after Michael Nalbandyan for  «Արարատյան երկիր» (Araratyan yerkir) essay.
In 1993, he was awarded with Honorary doctor of Louisiana State University for protection of human rights and freedom of speech.
In 1999, he was awarded with gold medal after Fridtjof Nansen.
In 2011, he was awarded with  “Элита мира” order by the international humanitarian fund.
In 2011, he was awarded with Movses Khorenatsi medal.
In 2014, he was declared as an honorable citizen of Javakhe and Yerevan.

References

Biography of Meruzhan Ter-Gulanyan on AV Production

External links
 Andin magazine

1948 births
Living people
Armenian male writers